Roger Franzén (born 17 July 1964) is a Swedish football manager and former player. He is currently National team coach of Sweden U17.

1964 births
Living people
Swedish footballers
Swedish football managers
Hammarby Fotboll managers
GIF Sundsvall managers

Association footballers not categorized by position